The 1951 NBA playoffs was the postseason tournament of the National Basketball Association 1950–51 season. The tournament concluded with the Western Division champion Rochester Royals defeating the Eastern Division champion New York Knicks 4 games to 3 in the NBA Finals.

The eight qualified teams began tournament play on Tuesday and Wednesday, March 20 and 21, and the Finals concluded on Saturday, April 21. Rochester and New York played 14 games in a span of 33 days; their seven final games in fifteen days.

The Rochester Royals (now the Sacramento Kings) were "royalty" in their first nine seasons, from 1945–46 to 1953–54 always one of the strong teams in their league. Rochester had played three seasons in the National Basketball League, winning the 1946 NBL championship and losing the Finals in 1947 and 1948. In one BAA and one NBA season, the team had won 75% of its games before losing in the second round, then first round, of the 1949 and 1950 playoffs. The 1950–51 team won more than 60% of its games, as the Royals would do for three more seasons, and participated in the club's only NBA Finals. That remains true more than 60 years later, covering stints in Rochester, Cincinnati, Kansas City, and Sacramento.

The New York Knicks were an original Basketball Association of America franchise, now in its sixth season and participating in the BAA or NBA Finals for the first time. It would be the first three consecutive years as losing finalist.

Another six-year-old, original BAA team, the Boston Celtics had qualified only for the 1948 BAA Playoffs. Now the second-place Eastern Division team, Boston had earned home-court advantage for a first-round series with third-place New York. It was the first playoff meeting in the Celtics–Knicks rivalry and it would be the first of 19 consecutive years in the playoffs.

Bracket

Division Semifinals

Eastern Division Semifinals

(1) Philadelphia Warriors vs. (4) Syracuse Nationals

This was the second playoff meeting between these two teams, with the 76ers/Nationals winning the first meeting.

(2) Boston Celtics vs. (3) New York Knicks

This was the first playoff meeting between these two teams.

Western Division Semifinals

(1) Minneapolis Lakers vs. (4) Indianapolis Olympians

This was the first playoff meeting between these two teams.

(2) Rochester Royals vs. (3) Fort Wayne Pistons

This was the second playoff meeting between these two teams, with the Pistons winning the first meeting.

Division Finals

Eastern Division Finals

(3) New York Knicks vs. (4) Syracuse Nationals

This was the second playoff meeting between these two teams, with the Nationals winning the first meeting.

Western Division Finals

(1) Minneapolis Lakers vs. (2) Rochester Royals

This was the second playoff meeting between these two teams, with the Lakers winning the first meeting.

NBA Finals: (W2) Rochester Royals vs. (E3) New York Knicks

 This was the first time in NBA playoff history a team has forced a seventh game after falling behind 3–0 in the series, and the only time to date in the NBA Finals.

This was the first playoff meeting between these two teams.

References

External links
 1951 Playoff Results at NBA.com
 1951 NBA Playoffs at Basketball-Reference.com

National Basketball Association playoffs
Playoffs

fi:NBA-kausi 1950–1951#Pudotuspelit